Sabalia picarina is a moth in the family Brahmaeidae (older classifications placed it in Lemoniidae). It was described by Francis Walker in 1865.

References

Brahmaeidae
Moths described in 1865